Shiphrah and Puah were two midwives who briefly prevented a genocide of children by the Egyptians, according to Exodus 1:15–21.  According to the Exodus narrative, they were commanded by the King of Egypt, or Pharaoh, to kill all male Hebrew babies, but they refused to do so. When challenged by the Pharaoh, they told him that Hebrew women's labour was short-lived because they were 'lively' or 'vigorous', and therefore the babies had been born (and protected) before the midwives arrived. God "dealt well with the midwives" and "made them houses".

Exodus 1:15–1:21

15 And the king of Egypt spoke to the Hebrew midwives, of whom the name of the one was Shiphrah, and the name of the other Puah;
16 and he said: 'When ye do the office of a midwife to the Hebrew women, ye shall look upon the birthstool: if it be a son, then ye shall kill him; but if it be a daughter, then she shall live.'
17 But the midwives feared God, and did not as the king of Egypt commanded them, but saved the men-children alive.
18 And the king of Egypt called for the midwives, and said unto them: 'Why have ye done this thing, and have saved the men-children alive?'
19 And the midwives said unto Pharaoh: 'Because the Hebrew women are not as the Egyptian women; for they are lively, and are delivered ere the midwife come unto them.'
20 And God dealt well with the midwives; and the people multiplied, and waxed very mighty.
21 And it came to pass, because the midwives feared God, that He made them houses.

Interpretations

The Talmud [Sotah 11b] identifies Shiphrah with Jochebed, the mother of Moses, and Puah with Miriam, Moses' sister, making the two midwives mother and daughter respectively.

"The midwives feared God"

The Torah has no word for religion.  The closest related concept found in the Torah is what it calls "the fear of God" (Exod. 1:17). The midwives apparently believed that God's moral demands outweighed Pharaoh's legal demands.  For this reason, author Francine Klagsbrun said that the midwives' refusal to follow the Pharaoh's genocidal instructions "may be the first known incident of civil disobedience in history." Theologian Jonathan Magonet agrees, calling them "the earliest, and in some ways the most powerful, examples, of resistance to an evil regime".

The "fear of God" theme is reversed a few verses later when Pharaoh commands the Egyptian people to carry out the genocide (Exod. 1:22).  The Egyptians apparently feared Pharaoh more than they feared God, and therefore, participated in the crime. Rabbi Joseph Telushkin compared the Shiphrah and Puah's defection with the rescuers of Jews during the Holocaust, many of whom had been religious.  Those who aided the Nazis, on the other hand, feared the Nazis' power more than they feared (or even believed in) God's judgment.

"Made houses"

Commentators have interpreted Exodus 1:20–21 in various ways. Some scholars argue that the two halves of each verse are parallel, so that it is the Israelites ('who multiplied and grew greatly') for whom God 'made houses'. This fits with the reference in Exodus 1:1 to the children of Israel coming down to Egypt, each with his "house".  However, Magonet notes that the more common view is that the houses are for the midwives - "houses" here being understood as 'dynasties'. Rabbinic thought has understood these as the houses of kehunah (priesthood), leviyah (assistants to the priests), and royalty – the latter interpreted as coming from Miriam.

Names
The name Šp-ra is found in a list of slaves in Egypt during the reign of Sobekhotep III (around 1745 BCE). This list is on Papyrus Brooklyn 35.1446, in the Brooklyn Museum. The museum states that "Scholars assume that this is a hieroglyphic transliteration of the Hebrew name Shiphra." The name means "to be fair" or "beautiful", and may be related to, or even the same as, the Aramaic Sapphira and (up to slight morphological adaptations) as Shiphrah, the name of the Hebrew midwife. The name of the second midwife, Puah, is a Canaanite name which means "lass" or "little girl".

External links
Original text of Exodus Chapter 1
 Hebrew – English original text at Mechon-Mamre.org
 Jewish Publication Society translation at Mechon-Mamre.org
 Judaica Press translation with Rashi's commentary at Chabad.org

References

Historical theories and materials on the Exodus
Women in the Hebrew Bible
Biblical midwives